The 2013–14 season of the F. League is the 7th season of top-tier futsal in Japan.

Teams

League table

Play Off

  Nagoya Oceans Wins the League
  Nagoya Oceans qualification at AFC Futsal Club Championship



References
F. League

External links
F. League

2009 10
2013 in futsal
2014 in futsal